Garden City or Garden Suburb may refer to:

Design and planning 
Garden city movement, emphasizing self-contained communities surrounded by "greenbelts"
Town and Country Planning Association, originally known as the Garden City Association

Places

Africa and the Middle East
Garden City (Cairo), Egypt, a district
Garden City (Nigeria), nickname of Port Harcourt

Asia
Bangalore, known as the "Garden City of India"
Putrajaya, Malaysia, nicknamed "Garden City"
Singapore, nicknamed the "Garden City" due to its parks and tree-lined streets

Europe

United Kingdom 
Garden City, Flintshire, Wales
Garden Suburb, Oldham, Greater Manchester, England
Hampstead Garden Suburb, London, England
Humberstone Garden Suburb, Leicester, England
Letchworth Garden City, Hertfordshire, England, designed by Ebenezer Howard, originator of the Garden City movement
Welwyn Garden City, Hertfordshire, England, also designed by Howard

France 
Garden City of Suresnes, designed by Alexandre Maistrasse, Julien Quoniam and Félix Dumail
, designed by Eugène Gonnot and Georges Albenque
, designed by Félix Dumail

Elsewhere in Europe
Gartenstadt (Garden City), a district of Krefeld, Germany

North America

Canada 
Garden City, Winnipeg
 Garden City Skyway, a major high-level bridge in St. Catharines and Niagara-on-the-Lake, Ontario, Canada
St. Catharines, Ontario, also known as "The Garden City"
Victoria, British Columbia, also known as "The Garden City"

United States 
Garden City, Alabama
Garden City, Colorado
Garden City, Florida
Garden City, Georgia
Garden City, Idaho
Garden City, Indiana
Garden City, Iowa
Garden City, Kansas
Garden City (Amtrak station)
Garden City, Michigan
Garden City, Minnesota
Garden City, Missouri
Garden City, New York
Garden City (LIRR station)
Garden City, Pennsylvania
Garden City, a village within Cranston, Rhode Island
Garden City, South Carolina
Garden City, South Dakota
Garden City, Texas
Garden City, Utah
Garden City, Roanoke, Virginia
Maitland, South Dakota, originally called Garden City
Missoula, Montana, nicknamed "The Garden City"

Oceania
Garden City, a shopping district in Suva, Fiji
Garden City, Victoria, a locality within Port Melbourne, Victoria
Garden Suburb, New South Wales, Australia
Christchurch, New Zealand, nicknamed "The Garden City"
Toowoomba, Queensland, Australia, nicknamed "The Garden City"
Westfield Garden City in Upper Mount Gravatt, Queenslan, Australia

South America
Ciudad Jardín Lomas del Palomar, Buenos Aires, Argentina
Maracay, Venezuela, nicknamed "Ciudad Jardín" ("Garden City")
Viña del Mar, Chile, nicknamed "Ciudad Jardín" ("Garden City")

See also
Garden City station (disambiguation), stations of the name
Knowle West, Bristol, England, built as a council housing estate constructed on garden city principles
Kuala Kubu Bharu, Selangor, Malaysia; the first garden township in Asia
Meadowridge, a suburb that is the second garden city in Cape Town, South Africa
Moor Pool, a garden suburb within the ward of Harborne, Birmingham, England
Nunsthorpe, a suburb of Grimsby, England
Pinelands, Cape Town, a garden city in Cape Town, South Africa
Södra Ängby, a residential area blending functionalism with garden city ideals, Stockholm, Sweden, forming part of the Bromma borough
Tapiola, a garden city district of Espoo, Finland
Wythenshawe, a district of Manchester, England, a housing estate started in the 1920s and intended as a "garden city"

Arts, entertainment, and media
"Garden City", B-side of the 1984 Orchestral Manoeuvres in the Dark single "Tesla Girls"
Garden City Radio 89.9, a radio station in Old GRA, Port Harcourt, Nigeria

Brands and enterprises
Garden City Hotel, in Garden City, New York, USA
Garden City Mall, Nairobi, a shopping complex in Kasarani, Kenya
Garden City Publishing, an imprint of Doubleday
Westfield Booragoon, a shopping centre in Booragoon, Western Australia formerly named Garden City
Westfield Mt Gravatt, a shopping centre in Upper Mount Gravatt, Brisbane, Australia formerly named Westfield Garden City

Other uses
Garden City Collegiate, a high school in Winnipeg, Manitoba

See also 

Garden Village (disambiguation)
Green City (disambiguation)
City of Trees (disambiguation)
Sustainable city, green city, or eco-city, designed with consideration of environmental impact